The 2014–15 Men's FIH Hockey World League Round 1 was held from June to December 2014. A total of 35 teams competing in 7 events were part in this round of the tournament playing for 15 berths in the Round 2, played from January to March 2015.

Qualification
Each national association member of the International Hockey Federation (FIH) had the opportunity to compete in the tournament. Teams ranked 20th and lower in the FIH World Rankings current at the time of seeking entries for the competition were allocated to one of the Round 1 events. The following 35 teams, shown with final pre-tournament rankings, competed in this round of the tournament.

 (22)
 (38)
 (40)
 (47)
 (31)
 (33)
 (54)
 (25)
 (48)
 (21)
 (56)
 (24)
 (70)
 (37)

 (42)

 (28)
 (67)
 (45)

 (30)
 (36)
 (72)
 (50)
 (20)
 (71)
 (51)
 (46)
 (41)

 (59)
 (34)
 (55)
 (27)

Sveti Ivan Zelina
Sveti Ivan Zelina, Croatia, 1–6 July 2014.

Pool
All times are Central European Summer Time (UTC+02:00)

 Advanced to Round 2

Awards
Top Goalscorer -  Dmitry Azarov

Hradec Králové
Hradec Králové, Czech Republic, 2–7 September 2014.

Pool
All times are Central European Summer Time (UTC+02:00)

 Advanced to Round 2

Dhaka
Dhaka, Bangladesh, 5–7 September 2014.

Pool
All times are Bangladesh Standard Time (UTC+06:00)

 Advanced to Round 2

Muscat
Muscat, Oman, 5–7 September 2014.

Pool
All times are Gulf Standard Time (UTC+04:00)

 Advanced to Round 2

Nairobi
Nairobi, Kenya, 5–7 September 2014.

Pool
All times are East Africa Time (UTC+03:00)

 Advanced to Round 2

Guadalajara
Guadalajara, Mexico, 12–14 September 2014.

Pool
All times are Central Daylight Time (UTC−06:00)

 Advanced to Round 2

Lousada
Lousada, Portugal, 12–14 September 2014.

Pool
All times are Western European Summer Time (UTC+01:00)

 Advanced to Round 2

Kingston
Kingston, Jamaica, 1–5 October 2014.

Pool
All times are Eastern Standard Time (UTC−05:00)

 Advanced to Round 2

Suva
Suva, Fiji, 6–11 December 2014.

Pool
All times are Fiji Summer Time (UTC+12:00)

 Advanced to Round 2

References

External links
Official website (Sveti Ivan Zelina)
Official website (Hradec Králové)
Official website (Dhaka)
Official website (Nairobi)
Official website (Muscat)
Official website (Guadalajara)
Official website (Lousada)
Official website (Kingston)
Official website (Suva)

Round 1